Edward Joseph (Ed) Dwight Jr. (born September 9, 1933) is an American sculptor, author, and former test pilot. He is the first African American to have entered the Air Force training program from which NASA selected astronauts. He was controversially not selected to officially join NASA.

Biography

Early life 
Dwight was born on September 9, 1933, in the racially segregated Kansas City, Kansas area, to Georgia Baker Dwight and Edward Dwight Sr., who played second base and centerfield for the Kansas City Monarchs and other Negro league teams from 1924 to 1937.

At age 4, Dwight built a toy airplane out of orange crates in his backyard. As a child, he was an avid reader and talented artist who was mechanically gifted and enjoyed working with his hands. He attended grade school at Our Lady of Perpetual Help in Kansas City. While delivering newspapers, he saw Air Force pilot Dayton Ragland, a Black man from Kansas City, on the front page of The Call. Having grown up in racist segregation, he instantly "wigged out", becoming inspired to follow this career path while thinking "This is insane. I didn't even know they let black pilots get anywhere near airplanes. ... Where did he get trained? How did he get in the military? How did all this stuff happen right before my nose?". In 1951, he became the first African-American male to graduate from Bishop Ward High School, a private Catholic high school in Kansas City, Kansas. He was a member of the National Honor Society and earned a scholarship to attend the Kansas City Art Institute. Dwight enrolled in Kansas City Junior College (later renamed Metropolitan Community College) and graduated with an Associate of Arts degree in engineering in 1953.

Career

Piloting 

Dwight enlisted in the United States Air Force in 1953.  He completed his airman and cadet pre-flight training at Lackland Air Force Base near San Antonio, Texas. He then traveled to Malden Air Base in Malden, Missouri, to finish his primary flight training. He earned a commission as an Air Force second lieutenant in 1955 before being assigned to Williams Air Force Base, southeast of Phoenix, Arizona.

While training to become a test pilot, Dwight attended night classes at Arizona State University. In 1957, he graduated cum laude with a B.S. in aeronautical engineering. Dwight later completed Air Force courses in experimental test piloting and aerospace research at Edwards Air Force Base in 1961 and 1962, respectively. He earned the rank of captain while serving in the Air Force.

Pre-astronaut training 
In 1961, Chuck Yeager was running the Aerospace Research Pilot School (ARPS), a US Air Force program that had sent some of its graduates into the astronauts corps. Yeager said Curtis LeMay called and told him, "Bobby Kennedy wants a colored in space. Get one into your course." Dwight was selected to enter ARPS shortly after that phone call. Dwight has said that Whitney Young of the National Urban League put the idea of a Black astronaut in President Kennedy's head during a meeting with Kennedy, Young, Dr. Martin Luther King, Jr. and A. Philip Randolph. However, in Dwight's telling, this meeting happened in 1959, when Whitney Young was an unknown college administrator. Young's biographer says that this meeting did not happen. Nonetheless, Dwight's selection into this Air Force program garnered international media attention, and Dwight appeared on the covers of news magazines such as Ebony, Jet, and Sepia.

Dwight proceeded to Phase II of (ARPS)  but was not selected by NASA to be an astronaut. He resigned from the Air Force in 1966, claiming, according to The Guardian, that "racial politics had forced him out of NASA and into the regular officer corps".

In August 2020, Dwight was made an honorary Space Force member in Washington, D.C.

Sculpting 
After resigning from the Air Force, Dwight worked as an engineer, in real estate, and for IBM. He opened a barbecue restaurant in Denver. Dwight was also a successful construction entrepreneur and occasionally "built things with scrap metal". Dwight's artistic interest in sculpting and interest in learning about black historical icons grew after Colorado's first black lieutenant governor, George L. Brown, commissioned him to create a statue for the state capitol building in 1974. Upon completion, Dwight moved to Denver and earned an M.F.A. in sculpture from the University of Denver in 1977. He learned how to operate the University of Denver's metal casting foundry in the mid-1970s.

Dwight has been recognized for his innovative use of negative space in sculpting. Each of his pieces involves Blacks and civil rights activists, with a focus on the themes of slavery, emancipation, and post-reconstruction. Most of the pieces depict only Black people, but the Underground Railroad Sculpture in Battle Creek also honors Erastus and Sarah Hussey, who were conductors on the Underground Railroad. Dwight's first major work was a commission in 1974 to create a sculpture of Colorado Lieutenant Governor George L. Brown. Soon after, he was commissioned by the Colorado Centennial Commission to create a series of bronze sculptures entitled "Black Frontier in the American West".

Soon after his completion of the "Black Frontier in the American West" exhibit, Dwight created a series of more than seventy bronze sculptures at the St. Louis Arch Museum at the request of the National Park Service. The series, "Jazz: An American Art Form", depicts the evolution of jazz and features jazz performers such as Louis Armstrong, Miles Davis, Duke Ellington, Ella Fitzgerald, Benny Goodman, and Charlie Parker.

Dwight owns and operates Ed Dwight Studios, based in Denver. Its . facility houses a studio, gallery, foundry, and a large collection of research material. The gallery and studio is open to the public.

Awards and honors 
 1986 – Honorary doctorate from Arizona State University
 2020 - Air Force Commander's Award for Public Service
 2020 – Bonfils-Stanton Foundation Artist Award
 2021 – Asteroid 92579 Dwight
 2022 – University of Denver CAHSS Lifetime Achievement Award

Personal life 
Dwight was raised Catholic, and served as an altar boy. In 1997, he was the lead sculptor on the statue of the Madonna and Child for the Our Mother of Africa Chapel, a structure devoted to African-American Catholics in the Basilica of the National Shrine of the Immaculate Conception, the largest church in North America. Dwight was the only black artist involved in the project.

Sculptures 
As of late 2019, Dwight has created 129 memorial sculptures and over 18,000 gallery pieces, which include paintings and sculptures. His works include these:

See also 
Tuskegee Airmen

References

External links 

 
 
 Barbaro, Michael (host), The Almost Moon Man, (July 21, 2019) The Daily. The New York Times podcast featuring journalist Emily Ludolph speaking with Ed Dwight.
 
 DiMeo, Nate, The Ballad of Captain Dwight  (August 28, 2015) Episode 75 of The Memory Palace, podcast centered on Dwight's astronaut training. Includes interview extracts.
  (December 19, 2019) part of The New York Times' Almost Famous Op-Doc series.

1933 births
Living people
20th-century American sculptors
American male sculptors
United States Air Force officers
People from Kansas City, Kansas
African-American sculptors
African-American Catholics
20th-century African-American artists
21st-century African-American people
20th-century American male artists
Sculptors from Kansas